Swea Township is a township in Kossuth County, Iowa, United States.

History
Swea Township was established in 1886. As the name Swea suggests, the township was originally settled largely by Swedes.

References

Townships in Kossuth County, Iowa
Townships in Iowa
1886 establishments in Iowa
Populated places established in 1886